Tricia Vessey (born 1972) is an American former actress, writer and producer. She has a Bachelor of Arts degree in Creative Writing and Film Production from Brooklyn College, New York.

Vessey grew up in Monterey, California. She has starred in several films, including the 1997 releases The Brave and Bean, the 1999 releases Coming Soon and Ghost Dog: The Way of the Samurai, and the 2001 releases Trouble Every Day, On the Edge and Town & Country.

Vessey 's last work was In the Production Office (2013), a web series that she co-created, directed, wrote, and produced; the series was screened at the 2015 International Film Festival Rotterdam.

She has one child, a son, with ex-boyfriend Anton Newcombe, a musician and producer.

References

External links
 
 

1972 births
American film actresses
Living people
People from Hollister, California
20th-century American actresses
21st-century American actresses
People from Monterey, California
Brooklyn College alumni